Zuzanów  is a village in Otwock County, Gmina Sobienie-Jeziory, Poland. From 1975 to 1998 the village was in Siedlce Voivodeship.

The population is around 80.

Villages in Otwock County